The football tournament at the 1997 West Asian Games took place from 20 to 27 November 1997. 

The host team Iran (represented by under 23 squad) won the gold medal in round robin competition, Syria won the silver and Kuwait finished with the bronze medal.

Results

References 
WAG federation website

External links 
 RSSSF

International association football competitions hosted by Iran
West Asian Games
1997 West Asian Games